Wang Kuang-hui (12 November 1964 – 30 August 2021) was a Taiwanese professional baseball player and coach. He spent his entire playing and coaching career in the Chinese Professional Baseball League with the Brother Elephants franchise.

Career
Wang joined the Brother Hotel amateur baseball team in 1988. Wang won the batting champion in the Chinese Professional Baseball League's inaugural 1990 season. In middle of the 2004 season, he retired as a player. Over the course of his career, Wang appeared in twelve straight all-star games, and won the Gold Glove Award three times. Wang began his coaching career as a hitting coach for the Elephants. In October 2006, Wang was named the team's field manager. He resigned as manager in May 2009. He then coached youth and college baseball teams from 2010. Wang was diagnosed with liver cancer in 2020 and died of the disease on 30 August 2021, at the age of 56.

His younger brother Wang Kuang-shih, played for the China Times Eagles as an infielder, and Wang's son  is an infielder for the CTBC Brothers.

As player

As manager

References

 

1964 births
2021 deaths
Brother Elephants coaches
Baseball first basemen
Brother Elephants managers
Brother Elephants players
Fu Jen Catholic University alumni
People from Hualien County
Taiwanese baseball players
Deaths from liver cancer
Deaths from cancer in Taiwan